The 1908 Connecticut gubernatorial election was held on November 3, 1908. Republican nominee George L. Lilley defeated Democratic nominee A. Heaton Robertson with 51.92% of the vote.

General election

Candidates
Major party candidates
George L. Lilley, Republican
A. Heaton Robertson, Democratic

Other candidates
Charles T. Peach, Socialist
Matthew E. O'Brien, Prohibition
F. C. Albrecht, Independent
Charles F. Roberts, Socialist Labor

Results

References

1908
Connecticut
Gubernatorial